The Jaison Water Tap or Jayson Water Tap (also known as Waste Not Water Tap)  is a self-closing water-saving tap invented in the early 20th century

by J.P. Subramonya Iyer at Travancore, South India. 
These taps were a common sight on the roads in erstwhile Travancore, part of modern-day Kerala state in South India.
They are quite popular throughout the Indian sub-continent and can still be commonly found in most of the traditional railway stations operated by Indian Railways.

The Jaison water tap is an excellent example of commercialized grass roots innovation from modern India, that went far beyond what is typically termed Jugaad or life hack. 
Its production was an economic activity that created wealth and helped solve the problem of water wastage in public water taps and thus brought significant benefits to the Indian society.

History 
J.P. Subramonya Iyer, who invented the tap, was a grass-root innovator, start-up hero, global technology merchant. He served as an insurance officer in the erstwhile Travancore-Cochin state. Upon noticing the wastage of water from road-side water taps that were carelessly left open, he perceived the need to develop an automatically closing tap. With the help of a few friends who were engineers such as Sri Rajangam (who was the Deputy Chief Mechanical Engineer of South Indian Railway aka S.I.R.) and S.L.Narayanan, he developed such a tap.
He patented the invention, improved it further and patented the improved tap version as well. 
However, it is not clear if any such crude self-closing water tap existed before the Jaison water taps were invented.

In order to facilitate large-scale production, Subramonya Iyer set up a factory at Karamana. Due to militant trade union activism prevalent in the region, the factory had to shut shop and moved to Coimbatore.

International use 
The Jayson Tap has been used in many countries such as Nepal, Sri Lanka and Bhutan particularly in rural environments.

HydroPlan, a German company, purchased the rights to produce, sell and distribute the tap worldwide except in India and Sri Lanka. Subsequently, the tap spread to Europe, England and Japan.

Current deployments 
Ironically, the popularity of this water tap is much lower in the Trivandrum city today.
Public water taps on roads face extinction in Kerala, due to the increasing affluence of people who get addicted to bottled water.

The Indian Railways still use the Jaison water taps effectively and widely across India, both inside the trains and at the stations. Both metal-based and plastic-based variants are in use.

See also 
 Automatic faucet

References 

Innovation in India
Water conservation